Riverview, California may refer to:
Riverview, Fresno County, California
Riverview, Kern County, California
Riverview, San Diego County, California
Riverview, Shasta County, California
Riverview, Yolo County, California